Ascog is a small village on the Isle of Bute, within Argyll and Bute council area, Scotland. The village is within the parish of Kingarth, and is situated on the A844. It is located on the east coast of the island, about 2 km to the south east of Rothesay. It is largely residential.

There are several historic buildings in the area, including Ascog House, Ascog Hall, and the Italianate style Balmory Hall. Loch Ascog lies to the west.

References

External links

Canmore - Bute, Ascog Castle site record
Canmore - Bute, Rothesay, Ascog, Ascog Point, General site record

Villages on the Isle of Bute